Bard Lake, also known as Wood Ranch Reservoir, is a  reservoir which is the largest lake in Simi Valley, California. It is east of the intersection of Olsen Road and Moorpark Freeway, near the border between Simi Valley and Thousand Oaks. It is an earthen dam which is owned by the Calleguas Water District.

Although the lake is fenced, there are numerous hiking trails in the area. Sunset Hills Open Space is a  adjacent preserve with hiking trails. Known for its rich avifauna, some of the bird species found here include White-tailed kites, Northern harriers, Anna's hummingbirds and Red-tailed hawks. Other fauna include rabbits, coyotes, mountain lions, bobcats, roadrunners, quail and vultures.

Nearby Sinaloa Lake is situated below Bard Lake in an adjacent part of the same watershed.

References

Simi Valley, California
Geography of Simi Valley, California
Reservoirs in Ventura County, California